Santa Rita is a former settlement in Santa Barbara County, California.

Santa Rita was named for its location on the former Santa Rita land grant, dated April 10, 1839. The land grant was named for Santa Rita de Cassis, an Augustinian whose feast day is May 22.

The Santa Rita post office operated from 1909 to 1914.

References

Former settlements in Santa Barbara County, California
Former populated places in California